Stickler is a family name which may refer to any of the following:

 Alfons Maria Stickler (1910, Neunkirchen — 2007), Austrian Roman Catholic clergyman
 Carla Stickler, American musical theatre actress
 Richard "Dick" E. Stickler (born 1940), U.S. politician
 Friedrich Stickler (born 1949), Austrian football official
 Gunnar B. Stickler (1925–2010), U.S. pediatrician
 Helen Stickler (born 1968), U.S. filmmaker
 Jason Stickler, a fictional character on the television series Cory in the House

Other uses 
 Stickler syndrome

German-language surnames